The 1901 Alabama Crimson White football team (variously "Alabama", "UA" or "Bama") represented the University of Alabama in the 1901 Southern Intercollegiate Athletic Association football season. The team was led by head coach M. S. Harvey, in his first season, and played their home games at The Quad in Tuscaloosa and one game each at Highland Park in Montgomery and at West End Park in Birmingham, Alabama. In what was the ninth season of Alabama football, the team finished with a record of two wins, one loss and two ties (2–1–2, 2–1–2 SIAA).

Schedule

Scoring note:

Game summaries

Mississippi

Alabama opened the 1901 season with a 41–0 victory over the University of Mississippi in Tuscaloosa. Alabama scored touchdowns in the first half on a short A. M. Donahoo run, a 60-yard W. A. Weaver run, a short Frank Houston Powe run, a short A. W. Stewart run and on a 90-yard Donahoo kickoff return. In the second half, Alabama scored touchdowns on a 33-yard Weaver and a 20-yard Powe runs for the 41–0 win. The victory brought Alabama's all-time record against Mississippi to 3–1.

Georgia

In the second all-time meeting against the University of Georgia, the game ended in a scoreless tie at Montgomery's Highland Park. In a game dominated by punts, the only score of the game was made by Earl Drennen only to be called back on a subsequent penalty. The tie brought Alabama's all-time record against Georgia to 0–1–1.

Auburn

Against the Alabama Polytechnic Institute (now known as Auburn University) Alabama was upset 17–0 at Tuscaloosa, in a game not officially scheduled until November 11, only four days prior to the contest. Auburn took an 11–0 lead in the first half on a pair of Matt Sloan touchdown runs. Auburn then scored their final points of the game on a W. H. Guinn touchdown run in the second half for the 17–0 victory. This was the second meeting in Tuscaloosa between Alabama and Auburn, and the next Iron Bowl in Tuscaloosa was not played until the 2000 season, 99 years later. The loss brought Alabama's all-time record against Auburn to 1–5.

Mississippi A&M

The day after their loss against Auburn, Alabama defeated the Aggies of Mississippi A&M (now known as Mississippi State University) 45–0 on The Quad. Alabama scored touchdowns in the first half on runs of 35-yards by A. W. Stewart, 15-yards by James Forman, 65-yards by W. A. Weaver and 60-yards from Daniels. In the second half, touchdowns were scored on runs of 30-yards from Daniels, a short Weaver run and a short and 33-yard Weaver run. The victory brought Alabama's all-time record against Mississippi A&M (Mississippi State) to 2–0.

Tennessee

In what was the first game against the rival University of Tennessee, it ended early in a 6–6 tie, when fans rushed onto the field after a controversial offside call and the umpires were unable to clear out the crowd in the second half. In the game, J. L. Broug scored for Tennessee and A. W. Stewart scored for Alabama.

Players

Notes

References

Alabama
Alabama Crimson Tide football seasons
Crimson Tide football